Mand in Iran may refer to:
 Mand-e Bala
 Mand-e Sofla